Hillel is a Jewish masculine given name and a surname. It may refer to:

Given name
 Hillel the Elder (110 BC–10 AD), Babylonian sage, scholar, and Jewish leader 
 Hillel, son of Gamaliel III (3rd century), Jewish scholar
 Hillel II, Jewish communal and religious authority and Nasi of the Jewish Sanhedrin, 320–385
 Hillel ben Eliakim (11th–12th century), Greek rabbi and Talmud scholar
 Hillel ben Samuel (c. 1220–1295), Italian physician, philosopher, and Talmudist
 Hillel ben Naphtali Zevi (1615–1690), Lithuanian rabbi
 Hillel Rivlin (1758–1838), Lithuanian rabbi
 Hillel Paritcher (1795–1864), Russian Chabad rabbi
 Hillel Lichtenstein (1814–1891), Hungarian rabbi and writer
 Hillel Noah Maggid (1829–1903), Russian-Jewish genealogist and historian
 Hillel Yaffe (1864–1936), Russian Jewish physician and Zionist leader 
 Hillel Zeitlin (1871–1942), Russian writer in Yiddish and Hebrew
 Hillel Poisic (1881–1953), Ukrainian communal worker and Torah scholar
 Hillel Oppenheimer (1899–1971), German-Israeli botanist
 Hillel Kook (1915–2001), Russian-Jewish Zionist activist, politician, and leader of the Irgun
 Hillel Seidel (1920–1999), Israeli politician
 Hillel Schwartz (1923–2007), Egyptian Jewish founder of the Iskra party
 Hillel Kristal, birth name of Hilly Kristal (1931–2007), American musician and owner of club CBGB in New York City
 Hillel Zaks (1931–2015), Polish-Israeli founder and rosh yeshiva of Yeshivas Knesses Hagedolah
 Hillel Jonathan Gitelman (1932-2015), American nephrologist who described Gitelman Syndrome
 Hillel Furstenberg (born 1935), American-Israeli mathematician
 Hillel Ticktin (born 1937), South African Marxist theorist and economist now at Glasgow University
 Hillel Halkin (born 1939), American-born Israeli translator, writer, and literary critic
 Hillel Weiss (born 1945), Israeli professor of literature and Neo-Zionist
 Hillel Schwartz (born 1948), American cultural historian, poet and translator
 Hillel Cohen (born 1961), Israeli historian
 Hillel Slovak (1962–1988), Israeli-American guitarist and founding member of the Red Hot Chili Peppers
 Hillel Horowitz (born 1964), Israeli rabbi and politician
 Hillel Roman (born 1975), American-Israeli visual artist
 Hillel Fendel, Israeli journalist
 Hillel Frisch, Israeli political scientist
 Hillel Neuer, Canadian human-rights lawyer and executive director of UN Watch
 Hillel Schenker, Israeli editor
 Hillel Steiner, Canadian political philosopher

Surname
 Simeon ben Hillel (1st century), son of Hillel the Elder
 Mordechai ben Hillel c. 1250–1298), German rabbi and posek
 Abraham Hillel (1820–1920), Iraqi rabbi
 Yehoshua Bar-Hillel (1915–1975), Israeli philosopher, mathematician, and linguist
 Shlomo Hillel (1923-2021), Iraqi-born Israeli diplomat and politician
 Ayin Hillel (1926–1990), Israeli poet and children's author 
 Stéphane Hillel (born 1955) French actor
 Gili Bar-Hillel (born 1974) Israeli English-Hebrew translator

See also
 Hallel, a Jewish prayer

Jewish masculine given names